Kim Andersen may refer to:

Kim Andersen (cyclist) (born 1958), former professional Danish road bicycle racer and current cycling team directeur sportif
Kim Andersen (jockey) (born 1963), jockey in Scandinavian horse racing
Kim Andersen (sailing), president of World Sailing
Kim Andersen (politician) (born 1957), Danish politician for Venstre

See also
Kim Anderson (disambiguation)
Kim Andersson (born 1982), Swedish handball player